Domenico del Barbieri (c. 1506 - c. 1570) was a Florentine artist of the Renaissance period, also referred to as Domenico del Barbiere, Domenico Fiorentino, and, in France, Dominique Florentin.

He settled and married at Troyes in France between 1530 and 1533. He joined the  studio of Italian artists who worked with Primaticcio and Rosso Fiorentino at Fontainebleau and Meudon. He worked both on the stucco-work and frescoes. He was also an engraver.

In 1541, he returned to Troyes, where he enjoyed success as a sculptor for churches. His style of sculpture was influenced, particularly in the heads and the drapery, by Andrea Sansovino, and shows Mannerist characteristics.  His Charity, at St. Pantaléon in Troyes, suggests that del Barbieri was aware of the contrapposto style of Michelangelo. His relief work for the tomb of Claude, Duke of Guise (died  1550), reveals the possible influence of Rosso and of Francesco Salviati.

Vasari noted del Barbieri in his writings.

Under the direction of Primaticcio, del Barbieri executed the base for the monument for the heart of Henry II of France, the figures for which were sculpted by Germain Pilon. Pilon may have been influenced in the flowing drapery of the figures of the Three Graces by del Barbieri's work. The monument was del Barbieri's last known commission.

Notes

References

Blunt, Anthony. Art and Architecture in France: 1500–1700. New Haven (CT): Yale University Press, [1957] 1999 edition. .

1500s births
1570s deaths
16th-century Italian painters
Italian male painters
Italian Renaissance painters
Renaissance sculptors
16th-century Italian sculptors
Italian male sculptors